Warren Frederick Bogle (born October 19, 1946) is a former American Major League Baseball pitcher. He appeared in 16 games played for the Oakland Athletics during the  season.  Bogle played college baseball at the University of Miami.

References

1946 births
Living people
Oakland Athletics players
Major League Baseball pitchers
Miami Hurricanes baseball players
Baseball players from New Jersey
Peninsula Grays players
Gulf Coast Athletics players
Leesburg A's players
Birmingham A's players
Iowa Oaks players
Sportspeople from Passaic, New Jersey